Koolkhan  is a locality north of Grafton on the Summerland Way in northern New South Wales, Australia. The North Coast railway passes through, and a now-closed railway station named after Matthew Norman was provided from 1905. Boom barriers were placed at the Copmanhurst road railway level crossing in November 2014. Koolkhan power station was a coal fired thermal station of about 20 MW that operated from 1952 to 1979. Coal came from the Nymboida mine. The station was located beside the river and used this water for condenser cooling and boiler make-up. It was the largest power station on the North Coast of NSW. It consisted of 3 turbo generators and six water tube boilers.

References

Towns in New South Wales
Clarence Valley Council